The General Maxwell R. Thurman Award is awarded on behalf of the commanding general of the United States Army Medical Research and Materiel Command at the American Telemedicine Association (ATA) annual conference in recognition of someone who exhibits and demonstrates the following qualities and attributes: a natural born leader, an innovator, someone who fosters positive change, a champion of the soldier, and a pioneer of the advancement of technology to enhance the life of our service members.  The award is named after four star General Maxwell R. Thurman, who was a champion of the soldier and a pioneer of advancing technology.  His famous motto, which is engraved on the award is as follows:  "The mission of the Army Medical Department is to provide world class combat casualty care to America's most precious resource - It's Sons  and Daughters - In Peace and War!"  This award was originally given out at the very first DoD "Global Forum"  by its creator, BG Russ Zajtchuk in 1995 and is now an annual tradition at every ATA meeting.

List of recipients

References

External links
https://web.archive.org/web/20110820221220/http://media.americantelemed.org/images/conf/05%20Conf/summary.thurman.jpg
https://web.archive.org/web/20110820221158/http://media.americantelemed.org/images/conf/02conf.thurmanaward.jpg

Military medicine in the United States
Technology in society
Telehealth
Health informatics
American awards
Awards established in 1996